Lake Pécs (Hungarian: Pécsi-tó) is a lake in Hungary. The lake is located north of the village of Orfű, in Baranya county; surrounding villages are Mecsekrákos and Tekeres. It is within the Mecsek mountain range, which separates the lake from the city of Pécs to the south. There are 4 lakes (Pécs, Orfű, Herman Ottó, Kovácsszénája) at Orfű next to each other.
The lake is used for angling, bathing and boating. There is also a Mill Museum, where millers mill wheat and sell homemade bread.

References

Pecs
Geography of Baranya County
Tourist attractions in Baranya County